Toby Morse (born April 8, 1970) is an American vocalist who is best known as the lead singer for punk rock band H2O. He is also one of the vocalists for hardcore punk group Hazen Street.

Early life 
Morse was born on April 8, 1970 in Taunton, Massachusetts, the youngest of three siblings. When he was three years old, his father died of a rare heart condition, and Morse was raised with the help of his brothers and grandparents because his mother started to work on multiple jobs. Morse and his family moved to Newport, Rhode Island, and later to St. Mary's County, Maryland. Around the age of twelve, Morse's siblings turned him on to skateboarding and punk music, taking him out to shows of bands such as Descendents and The F.U.'s. They also were having parties at the house, but "seeing the way they acted when they were high or drunk really scared" him. By age thirteen he discovered the song "Straight Edge" of Minor Threat and claimed edge, having never drunk before. Morse graduated from Great Mills High School in 1988.

Career 
In 1988, Morse relocated to New York City to be nearer to its hardcore punk scene. That year, he was living in the same house as band Gorilla Biscuits and sang backing vocals on their album Start Today. In 1989, Morse started being a roadie for bands such as Gorilla Biscuits, Killing Time and finally Sick of It All, staying with them for several years. Initially during the soundchecks and then at their shows, Morse would join the group to perform the song "My Love is Real". By then, along with his friends Rusty Pistachio and Eric Rice, he formed H2O, playing their first show in December 1994. They became part of the New York hardcore scene.

In 2004, Morse started collaborating with David Kennedy, best known for being in Tom Delonge's side-project Box Car Racer. Out of this came Hazen Street, which included Toby's friend Freddy Cricien, of another New York hardcore band Madball, as a co-vocalist.

In 2006, Morse started a clothing line called Straight Edge OG (stylized as SXEOG).

One Life, One Chance 
In 2009, Toby Morse founded the nonprofit organization "One Life, One Chance" whose objective is "to inspire kids to make healthy life choices, maintain a PMA, be themselves, and to avoid peer pressure", mainly visiting schools to share the experiences of his early life and as a member of a world-touring band. Its name comes from the song of the same name of the 1999 album F.T.T.W..

O.L.O.C. was prompted by a teacher friend of Morse who invited him to give a talk at a school in Queens, New York City, in early 2009, because her students were fans of H2O, which had a widely positive reception.

Contributors to the organization include Travis Barker, CM Punk, C. J. Wilson, Moby, Hayley Williams and Ethan Suplee, among others.

Personal life 
Morse currently resides in Los Angeles with his wife Moon and son Max. In 1988, he became a vegetarian inspired by the song "Cats and Dogs" of Gorilla Biscuits and, as of 2016, he is the only vegan in H2O. From 2006 to 2010, he was nominated for the title of "World's Sexiest Vegetarian" by Peta2. Morse is also the only H2O member who has remained straight edge through all their years active.

He is the younger brother of Todd Morse, guitarist for H2O, The Operation M.D., Juliette and the Licks and The Offspring.

Discography

H2O 
 H2O (1996)
 Thicker than Water (1997)
 F.T.T.W. (1999)
 Go (2001)
 Nothing to Prove (2008)
 Don't Forget Your Roots (2011)
 Use Your Voice  (2015)

Hazen Street 
Hazen Street (2004)

Guest appearances

References

External links 
 One Life, One Chance
 Official H2O website
 Metal Hammer interview with H2O, January 2001

Living people
1970 births
American punk rock singers
People from St. Mary's County, Maryland
People from Taunton, Massachusetts
Singers from Maryland
Singers from Massachusetts
21st-century American singers
Hazen Street members